Westlake Girls High School is a state girls secondary school, located to the west of Lake Pupuke in Takapuna, Auckland, New Zealand. The school was established in 1957 as a coeducational school, changing to girls only in 1962 when Westlake Boys High School opened. Westlake Girls has a roll of approximately  students from Years 9 to 13 (ages 12 to 18), making one of the largest single-sex schools in New Zealand.

The school is divided into five house groups: Akoranga (black), Hauraki (yellow), Onewa (red), Pupuke (blue) and Wairau (green).

History
The school has its origin in 1957, when it opened as a co-ed institution. In 1962 Westlake Girls and Westlake Boys High School emerged as separate schools, though they maintain relations.

After three decades of service, principal Alison Gernhoefer retired at the end of 2011, succeeded by Roz Mexted. In the 1994 Queen's Birthday Honours, Gernhoefer was appointed a Companion of the Queen's Service Order for public services. The Gernhoefer Administration building is named in her honour. She died on 12 April 2022.

Mexted was principal from November 2011 to November 2016. Changes during her tenure were the introduction of a new Junior and Senior uniform, and the development of the undercover netball and tennis courts visible from the motorway. The house system was also updated in an effort to increase school unity and spirit.

Jane Stanley was appointed to succeed Mexted and took up the position of principal at the beginning of the second term in May 2017. She is married to former Olympic rower Mike Stanley.

Westlake Girls and Boys
Physically merely a few hundred metres apart, Westlake Girls and Westlake Boys engage in an annual theatrical production together, several joint musical ensembles (including a joint choir, two orchestras, a concert band and a jazz band), and some social dances, among other things. The two schools share a motto – Virtute Experiamur (Let Courage Be Thy Test).

Principals

Notable alumni

 Rosie Cheng – tennis player
 Erin Naylor – association footballer
 Jo Aleh – sailor
 Alethea Boon – athlete, gymnast, weightlifter
 Cathie Dunsford – novelist, poet, anthologist, lecturer and publishing consultant
 Joanne Gair – artist, bodypainter
 Nikki Jenkins – gymnast
 Jenny Kirk – politician
 Kayla McAlister – rugby sevens player
 Judy Millar – artist
 Carol Oyler – cricketer
 Anona Pak – badminton player
 Katie Perkins – cricketer
 Karen Plummer – cricketer
 Allison Roe – athlete
 Rebecca Sowden – association footballer
 Kate Sylvester – fashion designer
 Rosita Vai – singer
 Lisa Wallbutton – basketball player
 Diana Wichtel – writer and critic
 Chelsea Winter – celebrity chef

References

External links
 Westlake Girls High School website

Educational institutions established in 1958
Girls' schools in New Zealand
Secondary schools in Auckland
North Shore, New Zealand
Alliance of Girls' Schools Australasia
1958 establishments in New Zealand